The Slave Coast is a historical name formerly used for that part of coastal West Africa along the Bight of Benin that is located between the Volta River and the Lagos Lagoon. The name is derived from the region's history as a major source of African people sold into slavery during the Atlantic slave trade from the early 16th century to the late 19th century.

Other nearby coastal regions historically known by their prime colonial export are the Gold Coast, the Ivory Coast (or Windward Coast), and the Pepper Coast (or Grain Coast).

Overview

European sources began documenting the development of trade in the "Slave Coast" region and its integration into the transatlantic slave trade around 1670. The transatlantic slave trade led to the formation of an "Atlantic community" of Africans and Europeans in the 17th, 18th, and 19th century. Roughly twelve million enslaved Africans were purchased by European slave traders from African merchants during the period of the transatlantic slave trade. Enslaved Africans were transported to the Americas to work on cash crop plantations in European colonies. Ports that exported these enslaved people from Africa include Ouidah, Lagos, Aného (Little Popo), Grand-Popo, Agoué, Jakin, Porto-Novo, and Badagry. These ports traded slaves who were supplied from African communities, tribes and kingdoms, including the Alladah and Ouidah, which were later taken over by the Dahomey kingdom.

Modern historians estimate that between two and three million people were transported out of this region and traded for goods like alcohol and tobacco from the Americas and textiles from Europe as part of the triangular trade. Historians have noted that though official records state that twelve million enslaved Africans were transported to the Americas from Africa, the actual number of slaves purchased by European slave traders was considerably higher. Alongside other forms of trade, this complex exchange also fostered cultural exchanges between these three regions, involving religions, architectural styles, languages, and knowledge. In addition to the enslaved people, free men used the exchange routes to travel to new destinations, and both slaves and free travellers helped blend European and African cultures. After the institution of slavery was abolished by successive European governments, the transatlantic slave trade continued for a time, with independent traders operating in violation of their countries' laws.

The coast was also called "the White man's grave" because of the mass amount of death from illnesses such as yellow fever, malaria, heat exhaustion, and many gastro-entero sicknesses. In 1841, 80% of British sailors serving in military expeditions on the Niger River were infected with fevers. Between 1844 and 1854, 20 of the 74 French missionaries in Senegal died from local illnesses, and 19 more died shortly after arriving back to France. Intermarriage has been documented in ports like Ouidah where Europeans were permanently stationed. Communication was quite extensive among all three areas of trade, to the point where even individual enslaved people could be tracked.

Human toll
The trans-Atlantic slave trade resulted in a vast and unknown loss of life for African captives both in and outside the Americas. Over a million people are thought to have died during their transport to the New World. More died soon after their arrival. The number of lives lost in the procurement of slaves remains a mystery but may equal or exceed the number of people who survived to be enslaved.

The savage nature of the trade led to the destruction of individuals and cultures. Historian Ana Lucia Araujo has noted that the process of enslavement did not end with arrival on Western Hemisphere shores; the different paths taken by the individuals and groups who were victims of the trans-Atlantic slave trade were influenced by different factors—including the disembarking region, the ability to be sold on the market, the kind of work performed, gender, age, religion, and language.

Patrick Manning estimates that about 12 million enslaved people were victims of the Atlantic trade between the 16th and 19th century, but about 1.5 million people died on board ships. About 10.5 million slaves arrived in the Americas. Besides the enslaved people who died on the Middle Passage, more African people likely died during the slave raids in Africa and forced marches to ports. Manning estimates that 4 million people died inside Africa after capture, and many more died young. Manning's estimate covers the 12 million people who were originally destined for the Atlantic, as well as the 6 million people destined for Asian slave markets and the 8 million people destined for African markets. Of the slaves shipped to the Americas, the largest share went to Brazil and the Caribbean.

See also
Bristol slave trade
Dutch Slave Coast

Notes

References 
 Law, Robin, "Slave-Raiders and Middlemen, Monopolists and Free-Traders: The Supply of Slaves for the Atlantic Trade in Dahomey c. 1750-1850", The Journal of African History, Vol.30, No. 1, 1989.
 Law, Robin. The Slave Coast of West Africa 1550–1750: The Impact of the Atlantic Slave Trade on an African Society. Clarendon Press, Oxford, 1991.

Further reading
 Law, Robin and Kristin Mann. "African and American Atlantic Worlds". The William and Mary Quarterly, 3rd Ser., 56:2 Apr. 1999, pp. 307–334.
 Shillington, Kevin. History of Africa. 2nd Edition, Macmillan Publishers Limited, NY USA, 2005.
 St Clair, William. The Door of No Return: The History of Cape Coast Castle and the Atlantic Slave Trade. BlueBridge.

External links 

 The Portuguese
 French Missionaries

West Africa
African slave trade
Regions of Africa
Coasts of the Atlantic Ocean
Historical regions